is a Japanese professional golfer. Ozaki is often known as Jumbo Ozaki (ジャンボ尾崎 Janbo Ozaki) on account of his height and length off the tee. He featured in the top ten of the Official World Golf Rankings for almost 200 weeks between 1989 and 1998. He is the most successful player of all time on the Japan Golf Tour, having led the money list a record 12 times and won 94 tournaments, over 40 more than the second highest player. Ozaki was inducted into the World Golf Hall of Fame in 2011.

Biography
Ozaki was born in Kaifu District, Tokushima. He was a professional baseball pitcher/outfielder from 1965 to 1967 with the Nishitetsu Lions, but he turned to professional golf at the age of 23 and won the Japan PGA Championship the following year.

Ozaki led the Japan Golf Tour in earnings in 1973–74, 1977, 1988–90, 1992, and 1994–98.  Ozaki finished 8th at The Masters in 1973 and finished 6th at the U.S. Open in 1989. He competed at the Masters 19 times. He played occasionally on the PGA Tour from 1972 to 2000, in 96 tournaments, though never more than nine in one year. In these starts, his best finish was a T-4 at the 1993 Memorial Tournament. Ozaki played on the International Team in the 1996 Presidents Cup. Ozaki built "AON Age" with his rivals Isao Aoki and Tsuneyuki "Tommy" Nakajima. Ozaki's brothers Tateo "Jet" and Naomichi "Joe" are also professional golfers and, like Masashi, have been extremely successful on the Japan Golf Tour with dozens of wins between them. Now in his seventies, he still plays on the Japan Golf Tour.

Professional wins (114)

Japan Golf Tour wins (94)

*Note: Tournament shortened to 54 holes due to weather.
1Co-sanctioned by the Asia Golf Circuit

Japan Golf Tour playoff record (12–9)

Other Japan wins (18) 
1971 (5) Japan PGA Championship, Nippon Series, Golf Digest Tournament, Miki Gold Cup (tie with Billy Casper), Setouchi Series Hiroshima leg
1972 (9) Wizard Tournament, Sapporo Open, Kanto Open, All Nippon Doubles, Nippon Series, Grand Monarch Tournament, First Flight Tournament, Chiba Open, Asahi International
1976 Chiba Open
1984 Kanagawa Open
1985 Kanagawa Open
1992 Sanko Grand Summer Tournament

Other wins (2)

Results in major championships

CUT = missed the half-way cut
"T" indicates a tie for a place

Summary

Most consecutive cuts made – 5 (twice)
Longest streak of top-10s – 1 (three times)

Results in The Players Championship

CUT = missed the halfway cut
WD = withdrew
"T" indicates a tie for a place

Team appearances
This list may be incomplete.
World Cup (representing Japan): 1974, 1988
Four Tours World Championship: (representing Japan) 1986 (winners), 1987, 1989
Presidents Cup (International team): 1996

See also
List of golfers with most Japan Golf Tour wins
Jumbo Ozaki no Hole In One - Famicom and Super Famicom video game

References

External links

Japanese male golfers
Japan Golf Tour golfers
World Golf Hall of Fame inductees
Japanese baseball players
Nishitetsu Lions players
Baseball people from Tokushima Prefecture
1947 births
Living people